This is a list of news programs broadcast by CNN. CNN is a 24-hour cable news network founded by media mogul Ted Turner. The network debuted on June 1, 1980.

Current programming

Weekday programming

Weekday programming cont. 
CNN announced a "new approach and format to dayside programming. These changes will roll out "in the coming months.":

Saturday programming

Saturday programming cont. 
These changes will roll out "in the coming months.":

Sunday programming

Sunday programming cont. 
These changes will roll out "in the coming months.":

Broadcast specials 

 Election Night in America (flagship banner for CNN's election coverage, simulcast on CNNI)
 New Year's Eve Live (annual coverage of Times Square's ball drop festivities, simulcast on CNNI)

CNN Original Series

Anthony Bourdain: Parts Unknown (2013–18)
Believer (2017)
Chasing Life with Dr. Sanjay Gupta (2019)
Chicagoland (2014)
Cold War (1998)
Declassified: Untold Stories of American Spies (2016–19)
The Hunt With John Walsh (2014–17)
The Kennedys (2018)
Long Road to Hell: America in Iraq (2015)
The Messy Truth with Van Jones (2016 documentary series and 2017 studio programs)
Millennium (1999)
Morgan Spurlock Inside Man (2013–16)
The Movies (2019)
Pope: The Most Powerful Man in History (2018)
The Radical Story of Patty Hearst (2018)
The Redemption Project with Van Jones (2019)
Somebody's Gotta Do It (2014–16)
This Is Life with Lisa Ling (2014–22)
United Shades of America (2016–present)
The Wonder List with Bill Weir (2015–17) (moved to CNN+ in 2022)
Christiane Amanpour Sex & Love Around the World (2018)
The Story of Late Night (2021)
First Ladies (2020)
Stanley Tucci: Searching for Italy (2021–22)
History of Sitcom (2021)
Jerusalem: City of Faith and Fury (2021)

Special Programming
CNN Heroes (2007–present)

CNN Films
Love, Gilda (2018)
RBG (2018)
Three Identical Strangers (2018)
Holy Hell (2016)
Now More than Ever: The History of Chicago (2017)
Unseen Enemy (2017) – CNN Films; 1 part; premiered on April 7, 2017
On the Trail: Inside the 2020 Primaries (2020)

Future programming
The 2010s
Eva Longoria: Searching for Mexico (2023)
See It Loud: The History of Black Television
Little Richard: I Am Everything (2023)

Former programming

References

 
CNN